Reitz may refer to:

 Reitz (surname)
 Reitz, Free State, small town in South Africa
 Reitz Lake, a lake in Minnesota, United States
 Redzikowo (German Reitz), village in northern Poland

See also
 Francis Joseph Reitz High School, (Public), Evansville, Indiana
Port Reitz
 Francis Joseph Reitz Memorial High School, (Catholic), Evansville, Indiana